"Sea Cruise" is a song written and sung by Huey "Piano" Smith and His Clowns. This recording was included on the 1971 Ace Records compilation Huey "Piano" Smith's Rock & Roll Revival!

Original release

The song was first released by Frankie Ford in 1959, sung over Smith's original backing track. On the Billboard charts, it reached number 14 in the Hot 100 and number 11 on the Hot R&B Sides. Released on Ace Records, it sold over one million copies, gaining gold disc status. The single included ship's bell and horn sound-effects, as well as boogie piano, a driving horn section and a shuffle beat that anticipated ska music.

Recorded cover versions
It was later also covered by:
 Charlie Drake released a comedy version of the song in the UK in 1959
 Jackie Edwards released a ska version in 1964
 Mickie Most covered the song in 1964 Columbia DB 7180
 Herman's Hermits covered the song in 1965 on the album Introducing Herman's Hermits.
 The Hondells covered the song in the 1960s, as seen on a Scopitone film.
Freddy Cannon covered it in a 1968 single released by "We Make Rock'N Roll Records" #1604
 Shakin' Stevens and the Sunsets covered the song on their album, I'm No J.D. 1971 which was released again in 1981 as "Shakin' Stevens & The Sunsets".
 The Houseshakers in Demolition Rock (1972) (available on CD Contours Of Rock 'n' Roll Raucous Records).
 Sha Na Na on The Night Is Still Young and Golden Age Of Rock 'n' Roll (both 1972).
 Jerry Lee Lewis in 1973 for his album The Session...Recorded in London with Great Artists.
 Commander Cody and His Lost Planet Airmen covered the song in 1973.
 Johnny Rivers recorded a studio version in 1971 and covered it in 1974 on the album Last Boogie in Paris.
 The Glitter Band covered the song on their album, Hey! (1974).
 John Fogerty covered it on his self-titled 1975 solo album.
 Nicky Hopkins covered it in 1975 on the album No More Changes.
 The Beach Boys, recorded c. 1976 for initial inclusion on 15 Big Ones (released on the 1981 compilation album Ten Years of Harmony featuring a vocal by Dennis Wilson)
 Robert Gordon and Link Wray covered the song on their 1977 album Robert Gordon with Link Wray.
 Johnny Hallyday on his C'est la vie album (1977).
 Rory Gallagher performed the song live in 1978–1979. The version from Wiesbaden, Germany, May 6, 1979, was included on his DVD At Rockpalast. Another version from December 1979 was released on Notes from San Francisco.
 Showaddywaddy covered the song on their 1979 album Crepes & Drapes.
 Billy "Crash" Craddock covered it in 1980 on the album Changes.
 Rico Rodriguez recorded an instrumental version in 1980 with The Specials.
 Don McLean on his 1981 album Believers
 Glenn Frey recorded the song on his first solo album, No Fun Aloud, in 1982, after having performed it with Eagles on the same year of their breakup, 1980.
 Anne Murray performed the song in her 1983 TV special Anne Murray: Caribbean Cruise.
 The Kidsongs Kids covered the song on their 1986 video "What I Want to Be!".
 Cliff Richard covered it on his 1990 live album From a Distance: The Event and then again with the Shadows on their 2009 album Reunited. 
 Dion covered the song in 1990 on the album The Adventures of Ford Fairlane.
 American R&B and boogie-woogie pianist and singer Little Willie Littlefield recorded a version for his 1997 album The Red One.
Jimmy Buffett covered the song on the 1995 album Margaritaville Cafe: Late Night Gumbo. It also appeared on M.O.M. – Music for our mother ocean – Vol 3 in 1999, and Jimmy's Live in Mansfield, MA CD released in 2004.
 Status Quo Covered the song as a B-Side on their 1999 single, "The Way It Goes."
 In 1976 actress Jill Clayburgh performed the song on Saturday Night Live (season one, episode 15), backed by the US Coast Guard’s a cappella group The Idlers.
 Yo La Tengo recorded the song for their covers album Yo La Tengo Is Murdering the Classics.
Gemmy Industries covered this song for their novelty toy Rocky the Singing Lobster in 2000

Song in other media
The song has been included in several soundtracks, including Gallagher's stand-up special Overboard, Ski Patrol in 1990 and Out to Sea in 1997.

See also
 List of 1950s one-hit wonders in the United States

References

1959 songs
Huey "Piano" Smith songs
Jimmy Buffett songs
Billy "Crash" Craddock songs
John Fogerty songs
Johnny Rivers songs
Little Willie Littlefield songs
The Beach Boys songs